Sarinthip Siriwan is a Thai actress. She made her debut in a leading role in the film  Hell Hotel by Rattana Pestonji with Chana Sri-ubon and Surasit Sattayawong. She is a three-time recipient of the Saraswati award. She received two in the Best Supporting Actress category for Free Chinese Movement 1959 and Son of the Northeast 1982, and one in the Best Comedienne category for Unending Fire of Passion. When she moved on to television dramas, her typical roles were as mothers due to her stern face. One of her most memorable role is as the matriarch in the television drama version of Ban sai thong with Jarunee Suksawat and Phorchet Kaenphet.

Early life 
Siriwan's real name is Phailin Collin and was born in Nakhon chaisri District, Nakhon Pathom in 1926. Her father is Dutch. She graduated from Phadung Darunee school.

Disappearance 
Siriwan disappeared on 3 December 1987, while she was filming the movie E chu ku pu pa by Kamthorn Thapkhanlai. Until now, no trace of her has been found.

See also
List of people who disappeared

Filmography 
 1957 - โรงแรมนรก (Rongraem narok / Hotel Hell)
 1959 - ขบวนเสรีจีน (Khabuan seri chin / Free Chinese Movement)
 1977 - แผลเก่า (Phlae kao)
 1979 - ลูกทาส (Look thas)
 1980 - บ้านทรายทอง (Ban sai thong)
 1982 - ลูกอีสาน (Son of the Northeast)
 1983 - รัตนาวดี (Rattanawadee)
 1986 - ไม่สิ้นไร้ไฟสวาท (Unending Fire of Passion)
 1988 - อีจู้กู้ปู่ป่า (E chu ku pu pa)

Drama 
 1961 - Si phaen din (สี่แผ่นดิน)
 1966 - Leuat Ayuddhaya (เลือดอยุธยา)
 1979 - Rom chat (ร่มฉัตร)
 1980 - Rak nan nirandorn (รักนั้นนิรันดร)
 1982 - Phor krua hua pah (พ่อครัวหัวป่าก์)
 1985 - Kar long foong (กาหลงฝูง)
 1987 - Fah tam (ฟ้าต่ำ)
 1988 - Sa mi ti tra (สามีตีตรา)

References 

1926 births
1980s missing person cases
Sarinthip Siriwan
Missing people
Sarinthip Siriwan
Sarinthip Siriwan
Sarinthip Siriwan
Sarinthip Siriwan